DJ SFR is a South African drum & bass, dubstep producer and DJ from Cape Town. SFR's sound is known for its jump up and dub influences.

Biography
SFR, also known as Julian Joseph, has been active as a drum & bass DJ and producer since 2003. He first rose to international prominence after winning DJ Hype's True Playaz mix competition in 2006. He has since released a number of drum & bass records on labels such as Trouble on Vinyl, Zombie Recordings and Load Recordings. In addition to his solo releases, he has also collaborated with Mix 'n Blend and Hyphen, whom he frequently DJ's back to back with at dubstep events.

His first dubstep tracks were released on XS Dubz in 2009.

SFR was recently interviewed on South African blog Dont Party for his production on Jack Parow track, Byellville.

Discography

Releases
 2006: Roots Fire Ridd'em on Big Love CD
 2007: No Escape on LOAD Recordings
 2007: Hypnosis / Rebound on Trouble on Vinyl
 2008: Confi'don / Visions feat. Hyphen on Zombie Recordings
 2009: Tantrum (with Mix 'n Blend) on African Dope
 2009: Swings Dub / Future Science on XS Dubz
 2010: Tourette Step / Binary Crunch on Guinea Pig

DJ performances
SFR has performed in the United Kingdom, France, Belgium, Germany, Switzerland, Sweden, and South Africa.
In Cape Town, DJ SFR is a frequent guest at the prominent underground club night Homegrown, as well as weekly event, It Came From The Jungle.

References

External links
 

1985 births
Living people
Club DJs
Dubstep musicians
Electronica musicians
South African dance musicians
South African drum and bass musicians
South African DJs
Electronic dance music DJs